Nike ( is a family name and feminine given name found in various cultures, deriving from Greek νίκη (nikē), "victory".  

It is sometimes traceable to Nike, the Greek goddess of victory, which is also present in the more frequently-occurring names Nicholas and Nicole.

In the case of people of Nigerian heritage, Nike is an element of Yoruba names signifying "cherished".

An alternative spelling is Nyke.

People with the given name Nike
Nike Ardilla (1975-1995), Indonesian singer
Nike Bent, Swedish Olympic alpine skier
Nike Borzov, Russian singer
Nike Davies-Okundaye, Nigerian designer
Nike Doggart, conservationist 
Nike Kornecki (born 1982), Israeli Olympic sailor
Nike Oshinowo-Soleye, Nigerian businesswoman
Nike Sun, mathematician
Nike Wagner (born 1945), German arts festival director 
Nyke Slawik (born 1994), German politician

Fictional characters
Nike in The Underland Chronicles children's books by Suzanne Collins

People with the surname Nike
John Nike, British hotel entrepreneur

See also
Nike (disambiguation)
Nika (given name)

References

Feminine given names
Greek feminine given names
Pages including recorded pronunciations